Riad Hammadou (born December 5, 1976 in Algiers) is a former Algerian footballer. He played the majority of his career for the French club Lille OSC.

Club career
Hammadou played for Lille and AS Beauvais Oise in the Ligue 1 and Ligue 2. He also had a spell in the Greek Super League with PAS Giannina F.C. during the 2002-03 season. He suffered a serious knee injury during a match against Panathinaikos in March 2003, and his career ended after just four matches with the club.

Honours
Lille OSC
 Ligue 2 : 2000

References

1976 births
Living people
Footballers from Algiers
Algerian footballers
Algerian expatriate footballers
Lille OSC players
AS Beauvais Oise players
PAS Giannina F.C. players
Ligue 1 players
Ligue 2 players
Super League Greece players
Expatriate footballers in Greece
Algerian expatriate sportspeople in Greece
Association football midfielders
21st-century Algerian people